Royal Limoges is a Limoges porcelain manufacturer. Created in 1797, it is the oldest Limoges porcelain factory still in operation. The nearby  is classified as a historic monument.

Today, it continues to make its own clay. Its decorations are imagined by style cabinets or by the decorators of its own clients and are all exclusive.

It was successively known under the names of Porcelaines Alluaud, CFH (Charles Field Haviland), GDM (Gérard Dufraisseix and Morel), GDA (Gérard Dufraisseix and Abbott), SLPG (Société Limousine de Gestion Porcelainière) and Royal Limoges.

The company also benefits from the Protected Geographical Indication (PGI).

References 

Porcelain of France
1797 establishments in France